Historia Musical (Eng.: Musical History) is a compilation album released by the romantic music band Los Temerarios with their greatest hits. This album became their second number-one album in the Billboard Top Latin Albums chart.

Track listing
This information from Billboard.com
Tu Infame Engaño (Gustavo Angel Alba) — 2:35
Tu Me Vas a Llorar (Adolfo Angel Alba) — 2:01
Si Quiero Volver (Adolfo Angel Alba) — 1:46
La Culpa No Tengo Yo (Adolfo Angel Alba) — 1:39
Al Otro Lado del Sol (Albert Hamond) — 1:13
Acepta Mi Error (Gustavo Angel ) — 1:23
Pequeña (Miguel Angel Alfaro) — 1:42
Si Tu Cariño No Está (Adolfo Angel Alba) — 1:53
Fueron Tus Palabras (Adolfo Angel Alba) — 1:21
Ven Porque Te Necesito (Adolfo Angel Alba) — 1:23
La Traicionera (Raymundo Barrios) — 1:38
Fue un Juego (Pedro Ulises) — 1:13
Dice Adiós Tu Mano Al Viento (Ze Luis) — 1:56
Una Lagrima Mas (Adolfo Angel Alba) — 1:41
Volveré de mi Viaje (Miguel Angel Alfaro) — 1:47
Una Miradita (Miguel Angel Alfaro) — 1:21
Dimelo (Adolfo Angel Alba) — 1:30
Soy un Solitario (Adolfo Angel Alba) — 1:29
Hoy Que Regreso Contigo (Adolfo Angel Alba) — 2:07
Faltas Tú (Adolfo Angel Alba) — 2:29

Chart performance

References

2002 compilation albums
Los Temerarios compilation albums
Disa Records compilation albums
Spanish-language compilation albums